The Central Fire Station at 203 W. Foster in Pampa, Texas was built in 1930.  It was listed on the National Register of Historic Places in 1999.

It was designed in Beaux Arts style by architect W.R. Kaufman & Son; it was built by Panhandle Construction of Pampa.

See also

National Register of Historic Places listings in Gray County, Texas

References

Fire stations on the National Register of Historic Places in Texas
National Register of Historic Places in Gray County, Texas
Beaux-Arts architecture in Texas
Buildings and structures completed in 1930